St. John's Evangelical Lutheran Church is a historic Evangelical Lutheran church at 923 NY 19 in Livingston, Columbia County, New York.  It was built in 1901-1902 and is a brick building with a medium pitched gable roof, deep bracketed cornice, and semi-engaged tower in the center bay of the front facade in the Late Gothic Revival style church.  It is a one-story building constructed of red pressed brick and wood frame, a high basement level, a high pitched gable roof, and two prominent towers of different heights.  The front gable features a three part pointed arch window.  The adjacent cemetery contains approximately 2,200 burials dating from 1821 to the present.

It was listed on the National Register of Historic Places in 2002.

References

Churches completed in 1901
20th-century Lutheran churches in the United States
Lutheran churches in New York (state)
Churches on the National Register of Historic Places in New York (state)
Gothic Revival church buildings in New York (state)
Churches in Columbia County, New York
National Register of Historic Places in Columbia County, New York